Carola Pavlik (born 1978) is a Dutch contemporary artist.

As an artist and creator of Czech descent Carola has always been creative and interested in the art of human behaviour & beauty from child on.
Pavlik was born in The Hague. She started her career as an artist by creating female figures out of aluminum, paper, and acrylic. These collections, where the focus has been on the female body, were exhibited in the So ART GALLERY in Amsterdam and at a private collector exhibition in Antwerp.

With her mirror art Carola Pavlik tells the story of how art can be used to inspire change. One of her main subject is creating self awareness, her artworks seems to transform by light. 

One of her pieces is the sculpture “Shine”, a feminine body covered with 57,000 Swarovski crystals. “Shine” hold a special crystal key to her precious body. She represents all women in complete acceptance and thankful for the beautiful body they were given. Each crystal, every woman ready to “Shine”

Her collection Iconic Reflections is made of brightly coloured large mirror artworks of seventeen inspiring women: Oprah Winfrey, Stedman Graham, Hillary Clinton, Beyoncé, Sheryl Sandberg, Julia Roberts, Queen Noor, Michelle Obama, Madonna, Sonia Gandhi, Angela Merkel, Angelina Jolie, Kate Middleton, Queen Maxima, Princess Beatrix, Dilma Rousseff, Kate Moss, and Linda de Mol.

She has exhibited in Antwerp, Amsterdam and London. Carola was also featured a.o in Dutch TV, RTL Boulevard, AD, Blauw Bloed, WEF and interviewed for a program by the UN Women.

References

Dutch contemporary artists
Artists from The Hague
1978 births
Living people